Marianne Bonde Pedersen (born 25 June 1984) is a Danish retired handball player who has played for teams such as Slagelse DT and FCK Håndbold as well as for the Danish national team. Among other tournaments, Bonde competed at the 2012 Summer Olympics and the 2013 World Championships where the Danish national team came in third. Bonde originally retired after the 2014–15 season but came out of retirement in 2017 to help Odense Håndbold who were suffering from multiple injuries and pregnancies.

References

Living people
1984 births
Danish female handball players
Handball players at the 2012 Summer Olympics
Olympic handball players of Denmark